Vattenad  is a small village in Pattambi taluk, Palakkad district in the state of Kerala, India. It is located in pattithara Panchayath near koottanad town.

References

Villages in Palakkad district